Norvel L. R. Lee (September 22, 1924 in Eagle Rock, Virginia – August 19, 1992 in Bethesda, Maryland) was an amateur boxer, Tuskegee Airman, WWII veteran, scholar, educator, senior USAF Reserve officer and youth mentor in the greater Washington D.C. area.  He won the light heavyweight gold medal in boxing at the Helsinki Olympic Games in 1952.  He was also awarded the Val Barker Trophy as the outstanding boxer of those Olympics.

Early life
Norvel LaFallette Ray Lee was born on September 22, 1924 to James Jackson ("Jack") Lee and his wife, George Anna Ray in the small town of Eagle Rock in Botetourt County, Virginia. He had three siblings; a sister, Edna Mae (1926), and two brothers, James Fitzhugh (1928) and George Edward (1936); George had a twin brother that died during childbirth. Norvel was educated in the segregated public schools of Virginia, graduating high school from the Academy Hill School for Negroes in Fincastle, Virginia.  He was baptized and worshipped at the Rising Mount Zion Baptist Church in Gala, Virginia.

Military service
In 1943 Norvel Lee was selected for flight training at the Tuskegee flight training program.  He earned his wings but was not assigned a squadron because of a stammer.  He served on a ground crew in the South Pacific at the end of WWII.

Later, while attending Howard University he enrolled in the ROTC program. Upon graduation he was commissioned an Air Force Reserve Officer. Upon retiring, he enlisted and was assigned to the 113th Tactical Fighter Wing, District of Columbia Air National Guard, Andrews Air Force Base.

Education
Lee received a Bachelor of Science Degree in Physical Education from Howard University, Master of Arts Degree in Adult Education from Federal City College (now known as the University of the District of Columbia) in 1969, and ABD from Catholic University, all located in Washington, D.C.

Boxing career

Norvel Lee began his boxing career while enrolled at Howard University. In 1948 he was on the U.S. Olympic Boxing Team for the London Olympics. In 1949 and 1950, he won the central division Intercollegiate Athletic Association championship. In 1950 and 1951, he won the National AAU crown, the New York City Golden Gloves championship and the Chicago Golden Gloves title. In 1951, he also participated in the Pan American Games in Argentina.

In 1952 at the 15th Olympiad in Helsinki, Finland he won the gold medal and for the light-heavyweight class. He was awarded the Val Barker Trophy as the outstanding boxer at the 1952 Olympic Games. The US team won five boxing gold medals in the Helsinki Game, including one for seventeen year old Floyd Patterson who Lee mentored before and during the games.  He didn't box again until the 1955 Pan Games in Mexico City where he won the bronze medal. After repeated offers, he refused to box professionally and retired with a 100-5 amateur record.

Lee maintained involvement in various administrative and policy-making boxing organizations, including serving as a member of the District of Columbia Boxing Commission for ten years; Chairman of the Commission for six years; and member of the executive board of the World Boxing Association for four years. He was an inductee and past president of the D.C. Boxing Hall of Fame, and Chief Judge, D.C. Boxing Commission. In 1964 he was invited to Gambia and Mali in Africa as a goodwill ambassador to teach boxing for two months in summer training programs.

Civil Rights Case 
In 1948, while returning from the 1948 Olympics to his hometown of Eagle Rock, he was arrested for violating the Jim Crow laws and refusing to move from his seat in the white-only section of a passenger train car; the NAACP posted his bail. He was found guilty and ordered to pay a fine of $5. He appealed to the Circuit Court of Allegheny County and lost. He was found guilty and fined $25. He appealed the case again and went before the Virginia State Supreme Court [Norvell Lee v. Commonwealth of Virginia, record 3558 (1949)] and the judgement of the court was overturned, resulting in him winning the landmark case.

Personal life
On June 22, 1951 Norvel married Leslie Ellen Jackson of Leesburg, Virginia. They had two daughters, Deborah Louise in 1954 and Denise Kay in 1955. His professional career began as a teacher and a counselor for the Department of Justice, Bureau of Prisons, and expanded to various administrative and managerial positions, including Director of Education for the D.C. Youth Center, D.C. Department of Corrections; Director of Training, D.C. Department of Public Welfare - Title V Training Program; Deputy Project Director, The Institute of Computer Technology; Director of Counseling Education, The Federal City College; Coordinator of Adult and Community Education, Baltimore City Department of Education where he served as Chairman of the Mayor's Manpower Advisory Council, Assistant Superintendent of Personnel, Assistant Superintendent of Adult and Community Education, and Coordinator; Manpower Skills Center. In addition, Lee was Director of Equal Employment Opportunity, Federal Emergency Management Agency; and Radiological Protection Officer and Emergency Operations Officer for the D.C. Office of Emergency Preparedness.

Later years and death
In 1991, Norvel retired after 36 years of government service. Throughout his years he was involved in various activities and received many professional and civic honors which included: President, Lamond Riggs Citizens Association; President, Parents Preschool Council of the District of Columbia; President, National Capital Child Day Care Association; Region II Vice President, American Society of Professional Emergency Planners; Vice President, National Skills Center Directors Association; President, Diplomat Cab Association; and a member of the American Society of Public Administrators. He was listed in "Who's Who Among Black Americans".

On August 19, 1992, he died from pancreatic cancer at the Bethesda Naval Medical Center in Maryland.

Bibliography 
Conklin, Kenneth F. (2020).  NORVEL:  An American Hero.

References

NORVEL LEE, BOXER IN 1952 OLYMPICS, DIES

External links
 
 
http://www.kennethfconklin.com/

1924 births
1992 deaths
African-American boxers
People from Botetourt County, Virginia
Boxers from Virginia
Featherweight boxers
Olympic boxers of the United States
Olympic gold medalists for the United States in boxing
Boxers at the 1952 Summer Olympics
National Golden Gloves champions
Winners of the United States Championship for amateur boxers
American male boxers
Medalists at the 1952 Summer Olympics
Pan American Games bronze medalists for the United States
Pan American Games medalists in boxing
Boxers at the 1951 Pan American Games
Boxers at the 1955 Pan American Games
Medalists at the 1951 Pan American Games
Medalists at the 1955 Pan American Games
Deaths from pancreatic cancer